Theobald II, Count of Blois (Thibaut II; c. 983 – 11 July 1004) was the eldest son and heir of Odo I, Count of Blois, and Bertha of Burgundy.

The stepson of Robert II of France, he became Count of Blois, Châteaudun, Chartres and Reims after the death of his father in 996. Theobald II left no heirs; on his death, he was succeeded by his younger brother, Odo II, Count of Blois.

References

Counts of Chartres
Counts of Châteaudun
Counts of Reims
Counts of Blois
Medieval child monarchs
980s births
1004 deaths
House of Blois